The 1991 Pacific hurricane season was a near-average Pacific hurricane season. The worst storm this year was Tropical Storm Ignacio, which killed 23 people in Mexico and injured 40 others. Elsewhere, Hurricane Fefa caused flooding in Hawaii. Hurricane Kevin was the strongest system of the season and became the then longest-lasting hurricane in the eastern north Pacific basin at the time, and Hurricane Nora was the strongest November storm to that point. The season officially started on May 15, 1991, in the eastern Pacific, and on June 1, 1991, in the central Pacific. It lasted until November 30, 1991, in both basins. These dates conventionally delimit the period of each year when most tropical cyclones form in the northeastern Pacific Ocean.

Seasonal summary

During the season, a total of sixteen tropical cyclones developed, featuring ten hurricanes, four tropical storms and two tropical depressions. These totals are close to the climatological averages established since 1966, when satellite surveillance began. However, the season was less active than 1990, which had a record 16 hurricanes (more than 1991). Yet, it ended late with the first November hurricane on record in the satellite era. On the other hand, the months of July and August, often the most active ones in this basin, only produced two tropical cyclones each. The activity in July was four systems below the average of six at that time due to unusual circulation patterns aloft over the tropical Pacific. A shorter gap in activity from late August to early September was attributed to anomalous flow patterns near the Baja California Peninsula. Several tropical cyclones grew into specially long-lived and intense systems. For example, Hurricane Kevin endured as a hurricane for 12½ days to the east of 140°W, establishing a new record for longevity in the eastern Pacific.

None of the tropical storms or hurricanes made landfall. One of the two tropical depressions of the season, Five-E, came ashore near Salina Cruz, Mexico, on the last day of June. Delores, Ignacio and Marty threatened the coast of Mexico, coming close enough to require tropical cyclone watches and warnings. Of these, Ignacio was also responsible for 40 injuries and 23 fatalities as the system passed just offshore of Lázaro Cárdenas. Public advisories were issued for four other systems due to the threat of heavy rain along the coast.

Tropical cyclone data was gathered at six hour intervals throughout the season. Even though most intensity assessments were estimates via the Dvorak Technique, there was a large research mission for tropical cyclogenesis in the Pacific. A NOAA research mission investigated Hurricane Jimena and gathered a few surface observations. Track forecasts were slightly more accurate than the past three years; intensity forecasts were comparable to the previous three seasons.

Systems

Tropical Storm Andres

On May 16, the first tropical depression of the season formed to the southwest of Baja California, out of a tropical disturbance that had developed during May 5 within the vicinity of Panama. During May 16 the depression gradually developed, before early the next day the National Hurricane Centre declared it a tropical storm and named it Andres. The newly named tropical cyclone reached its peak intensity of 60 mph (95 km/h), later that day. After maintaining its peak intensity for 24 hours, Andres started to gradually weaken as upper level windshear over the system increased before it dissipated during May 20. Throughout its life as a tropical cyclone, Andres moved very little and slowly executed a cyclonic loop, while remaining well away from any land.

Tropical Storm Blanca

A well organized tropical wave over northern Africa entered the Atlantic Ocean on May 31. The wave never showed signs of organization while crossing the Atlantic. It emerged into the eastern north Pacific on June 10. It was not until June 13 when the convection associated with the wave became better organized. On June 14, Tropical Depression Two-E formed at a location about 515 mi (830 km) from Acapulco, Mexico.

For the next 48 hours, the depression moved toward the west and then northwest in response to a weakening ridge to the northwest. On June 17, the strong shear relaxed somewhat and the exposed center moved under the deep convection again. Thus, the depression strengthened into a tropical storm about 725 mi (1,165 km) south of the southern tip of Baja California. Tropical Storm Blanca experienced limited development,  reaching its peak windspeed of 60 mph (95 km/h) early on June 20. Then, the center of Blanca became exposed again and weakened into a tropical depression on June 21. Finally, it dissipated on June 22 over colder waters about 1285 mi (2,380 km) southwest of the southern tip of Baja California. There were no casualties or damages attributed to this tropical cyclone.

Hurricane Carlos

A tropical wave left the African coast on June 4 showing some cyclonic curvature in the low clouds. It passed Barbados six days later, where a low-to-mid wind shift was detected. The wave was followed by a low level wind surge which was observed in Curaçao on June 12. Most of the shower activity associated with the wave moved westward over South America, and then over Panama on June 14. The convection became organized and developed into Tropical Depression Three-E on June 16 while it was located 350 mi (560 km) south of Salina Cruz. It became a tropical storm one day later. Carlos reached minimal hurricane strength on June 18. Two days later, Carlos was briefly downgraded to tropical storm status. A strong high pressure system forced Carlos to move over warmer waters and Carlos began to reintensify. Carlos regained hurricane status and developed a well-defined eye and excellent upper level outflow. On June 24, Carlos peaked at  central pressure and 115 mph (185 km/h) maximum sustained winds. The hurricane then weakened when it moved west over colder waters and encountered upper-level shear. Carlos dissipated on June 27. The National Hurricane Center received no reports of impact due to this tropical cyclone.

Hurricane Delores

Delores developed from a tropical wave which moved from Africa to the Atlantic on June 7. And it was not until June 22 when it gained organization and was identified as an area of disturbed weather south of Mexico.

The system immediately showed signs of rotation and it was designated Tropical Depression Four-E the same day. Then, the depression reached storm strength, and was named Delores on June 24 while 145 mi (230 km) from the coast of Mexico. It rapidly intensified to a hurricane on June 25 as it approached to the coast. However it rapidly weakened and on June 27 it was downgraded to tropical storm status as it was moving over colder waters. Its deep convection gradually diminished and its west-northwestward motion abruptly halted as the system was being sheared. It weakened to a depression on June 28 near Socorro Island and it dissipated on June 29.

In response to Delores' approach, the Mexican government issued a tropical storm warning and a hurricane watch from Ixtapa to Manzanillo on June 24. The watch and the warning were dropped the next day. The cyclone remained far away enough that no reports of high winds were received. Satellite observations indicated that heavy rains fell in affected areas from June 23 to 26. However, no damages or casualties were reported.

Tropical Depression Five-E

A tropical disturbance south of the Gulf of Tehuantepec became better organized on June 29 and became a tropical depression. Strengthening was very limited as the depression was approaching to land. It made landfall later that day very near of Salina Cruz, Oaxaca. As it continued its west-northwest track, it dissipated inland after bringing torrential rains.

Five-E caused the year's lone fatality and caused the most significant damage. Five-E destroyed up to 118 homes, injured 500, and also caused two people to go missing.

Hurricane Enrique

Enrique formed from a westward-moving tropical wave that crossed the Atlantic from June 30 to July 8. A short-lived cyclonic circulation center within the wave was detected on satellite imagery when the system was over the eastern Atlantic. However, persistent deep convection did not occur until the wave neared the Gulf of Tehuantepec in the eastern Pacific Ocean on July 11. On July 14, it became better organized. Based on reports from satellite imagery the low had developed into the seasons season's sixth tropical depression on July 15. The depression intensified further and was upgraded to Tropical Storm Enrique the next day as it became better organized.

Enrique steadily intensified and by early on July 16, the National Hurricane Center was anticipating for the system to reach hurricane intensity. Continuing to strengthen, it reached hurricane status On July 17. However, this was for a short period of time as it developed an eye. Due to uncertainty in the storm's intensity that day, it is possible that it could have been a hurricane earlier than originally estimated. Wind shear associated with a trough and passage over cooler waters caused Enrique to begin weakening and the cyclone's center soon became exposed. Enrique was downgraded to a depression on July 19 and the weakening cyclone crossed into the central Pacific on July 20. The system persisted drifting northwestward for several days, while maintaining a well-defined, albeit weak, center of circulation. On July 27, after it passed well to the north of the Hawaiian Islands, Enrique managed to briefly re-intensify to tropical storm status, attaining a secondary peak intensity of 50 mph (85 km/h), while completing a clockwise loop. As Enrique headed toward the Midway Island, increased wind shear weakened the system, causing another downgrade to depression status. As the storm approached the International Dateline, the system started to restrengthen. Shortly after crossing the dateline, Enrique became a tropical storm again on August 1. It lasted for less than 24 hours before it lost its convection and thus the cyclone began to dissipate. No damages or casualties were caused by Enrique.

Hurricane Fefa

A tropical wave became better organized and it developed into Tropical Depression Seven-E while 976 miles (1570 km) south-southeast of Cabo San Lucas on July 29. The depression intensified quickly and became Tropical Storm Fefa the same day. Fefa continued to strengthen over the warm Pacific water and reached hurricane status on July 31. Satellite imagery showed the appearance of an eye on August 1. Fefa crossed into the north central Pacific basin on August 5. As it crossed, wind shear increased and Fefa began to weaken as it approached the Hawaiian Islands as a tropical storm on August 7. Fefa passed over the Big Island and rapidly weakened back to a tropical depression later that day. It finally dissipated on August 9 when northwest Kauai.

The remnants of Fefa caused heavy rains and strong winds in the counties of Hawaii and Kauai. Flash flooding was reported in the Kohala and Hamakua districts. Lightning injured two persons on the Big Island.

Hurricane Guillermo

A significant tropical wave with very little deep convection left Africa on July 22. It crossed the Atlantic, with convection associated with its southern part passing over the Windward Islands on July 28 and crossing Central America on July 31.

Signs of organization were evident late on August 2 when the wave was south of the Gulf of Tehuantepec. Then, on August 4, Tropical Depression Eight-E was formed while centered 350 mi (560 km) south-southeast of Acapulco. Despite the presence of easterly shear, the depression gradually intensified as the center moved toward the west-northwest, paralleling the coast of Mexico. Then, it reached tropical storm strength the same day. At that time, it was centered south-southwest of Acapulco.
After its peak, Guillermo weakened to tropical storm status as it began losing convection. It subsequently weakened to a tropical depression and dissipated after that on August 10. There were no damages or casualties associated with this tropical cyclone.

Tropical Storm Hilda

Satellite imagery showed a convective area with some cyclonic turning in connection with a tropical wave over Africa on July 22. The convection gradually diminished as the system moved west-southwest into the Atlantic. On July 31, the wave passed south of Trinidad, where a low-level wind shift was detected. For the next couple of days, this system passed over Venezuela and Colombia. Then it crossed into the Pacific basin. It was not until August 6, while it was south of Guatemala, when the convection became organized. Then, the wave strengthened into a tropical depression about 230 mi (370 km/h) south-southwest of Acapulco, on August 8. The system intensified further and became Tropical Storm Hilda August 9. The tropical storm moved on a general west-northwest track for the next couple of days and then turned toward the north on August 13 as it was under the influence of an upper level trough.

Hilda gradually weakened over cool waters but maintained a rather large level of circulation. This caused its dissipation to be slower than normal. Tropical Depression Hilda dissipated on August 14. It large remnant circulation continued northwards and eventually passed over California. There were no casualties or damages attributed to this tropical cyclone. Hilda's remnants caused rain as far north as San Francisco.

Tropical Depression Ten-E

A tropical disturbance southwest of Manzanillo, Colima became a tropical depression on September 12 when its convection became persistent around a newly formed center of circulation. Conditions were not favorable for development because of strong wind shear environment caused by a trough. The depression took a northward track and dissipates on September 13 as it was being sheared just south of the Gulf of California.

Tropical Depression Ten-E brought heavy showers to parts of Mexico. There were no reported deaths or damages.

Tropical Storm Ignacio

On September 11, a tropical wave entered the eastern Pacific. A trough axis extended southward from the low to the west of the convection. By September 15, the area of disturbed weather included some convective bands. The organization of the convection improved and the cloud system became Tropical Depression Eleven-E the next day. The trough that was near the depression moved the cyclone to the north-northwest, allowing for deepening, with the depression being upgraded to Tropical Storm Ignacio later that day. The track of the tropical storm transcribed a small clockwise loop, and Ignacio reached the northernmost point of the loop on September 17. Further intensification was precluded by the storm's proximity to land and by shear associated with the upper-level low now located near the Baja California peninsula. As Ignacio turned toward the east, its forward motion slowed. When the storm began moving to the south, it lost its identity very rapidly. Ignacio weakened to depression status and dissipated six hours later. The remnants of Ignacio moved toward the west-southwest over the next two days.

Tropical Storm Ignacio dropped heavy rains over a large area of Mexico. Ten people died in Guerrero due to flash flooding. The remnants of the storm caused several dams to burst in the state of Chihuahua, leaving 10,000 people homeless and killing another 13. Overall, 40 people were injured.

Hurricane Jimena

Part of the same tropical wave that formed Tropical Storm Danny in the Atlantic crossed over the Isthmus of Panama and became a disturbance in the Intertropical Convergence Zone during mid to late September. On September 20 the cloud pattern had increased in organization and the system was designated a tropical depression. Continuing to strengthen, the depression became a tropical storm on September 21. The tropical storm then headed towards the northwest. Development was rapid, especially after September 22 as a banding type eye was forming. Jimena maintained itself as a powerful hurricane for three days, moving west until September 26, when it turned toward the west-northwest. Jimena began to weaken on September 27. A northwestward movement commenced on September 29 in response to a large upper-level trough which developed in its northwest. It continued to weaken and on September 30 it regained tropical storm intensity before becoming downgraded to a depression. On October 2, Jimena dissipated as a tropical cyclone. Hurricane Jimena caused no reported damage or casualties.

Hurricane Kevin

Kevin formed from a westward-moving tropical wave which emerged from the northwest coast of Africa on September 11. The wave crossed into the Pacific basin on September 21 with no signs of development. Then the depression moved toward the west. The banding pattern became more pronounced and the depression was upgraded to Tropical Storm Kevin later that day, being centered about 316 mi (509 km) south-southeast of Acapulco. Kevin continued to strengthen and an eye intermittently appeared on September 27 and 28.

By September 29, Kevin had a well-defined eye and this feature persisted for several days. Kevin was moving toward the west at this time. It turned toward the west-southwest due to a strong high pressure system located northwest of the hurricane. Then, Kevin began to weaken gradually and its eye became poorly defined on October 4. It weakened on October 6 as the hurricane began turning toward the northwest and continued this general motion for the next few days.

But this was short-lived and on October 8 the hurricane began to weaken again and on October 9 it had entered into the Central Pacific basin as a waning Category 1 hurricane. After this crossing, it was subsequently downgraded to storm strength the same day and on October 11, to a depression. It dissipated as a tropical cyclone that same day. The remnant circulation did persist a while longer as it slowly drifted north to finally lose its identity late on October 14. Despite its long life, Hurricane Kevin caused no damage or casualties. Because Kevin passed north of Hawaii, its only effect on land was increased trade winds.

Hurricane Linda

The tropical wave that ultimately produced Hurricane Linda emerged from the northwest coast of Africa on September 16 and tracked westward across the tropical Atlantic. The convection increased markedly upon approaching the Lesser Antilles on September 21. The tropical wave's northern portion split off to the north and caused showers in Jamaica, the Bahamas and Cuba while the southern part continued and crossed Panama into the Pacific basin on September 25 as a group of disorganized cloud clusters. It took many days to organize and it was not until October 3 when organization improved and the wave became Tropical Depression Fourteen-E.

The tropical depression moved toward the northwest while strengthening and became Tropical Storm Linda within 12 hours. As Linda then drifted to the north it was upgraded to a hurricane on October 5. Linda began to weaken as it was following Kevin's track and entered to colder waters. Linda turned the west-northwest and passed  from Socorro Island, where it caused  sustained winds on October 7. Later that day, Linda weakened to a tropical storm. On October 9, as Linda was following Kevin's track, the cyclone continued to weaken and was downgraded to a depression, although deep convection continued to intermittently appear. Finally, on early October 14, Linda dissipated. There were no reported casualties or damages from Linda.

Hurricane Marty

On October 5, a tropical wave crossed Central America and it began to organize the next day. It became a tropical storm on October 8 and was named Marty. It reached hurricane status early on October 10 while moving parallel to the coast of Mexico. There were several occasions when an eye was becoming apparent in satellite imagery but it never fully developed. An upper trough over the Western United States forced Marty to moved toward the northwest and north for a while, bringing the hurricane to waters previously cooled by hurricanes Kevin and Linda. Then, Marty disorganized and weakened into a tropical storm. Also, the trough which forced Marty northward moved out of the area, which made that Marty turned sharply to the west, then west-southwest around a high pressure system. Marty weakened further and remained as a tropical depression. It finally dissipated on October 18.

On October 8, Marty was threatening enough to prompt the Mexican government to issue a tropical storm watch from Manzanillo to Acapulco. The warning was dropped on October 9 when Marty moved away. There were no associated casualties or damages with this tropical cyclone.

Hurricane Nora

During that day the depression moved towards the northwest, intensified into a tropical storm and was named Nora later that day. On the next day, the storm gradually intensified further while temporarily moving towards the west, due to the flow field around a strengthening high pressure system located to the north of Nora. After developing an eye, Nora intensified into a hurricane.

On November 9, Nora. It peaked as a Category 2 hurricane on November 10. A large trough moved in from the west and formed a low. Shear increased and disrupted Nora's convection. The low also caused an abrupt change of course to the northeast. Nora weakened to a depression on November 11 and dissipated the next day. Nora's remnants continued to the northeast, showing brief flare-ups of convection. No deaths or damage were reported to have occurred in association with Nora, despite probable rainfall totals of around  within the Mexican states of Sinaloa and Nayarit.

Storm names
The following names were used for named storms that formed in the eastern Pacific in 1991. Names that were not assigned are marked in gray. The names not retired from this list were used again in the 1997 season. This is the same list used for the 1985 season. Also, the name "Dolores" was misspelled "Delores" in this season; however in subsequent seasons, the typo was corrected.

† – The initial spelling is Dolores, however the name Delores was used this season.

For storms that form in the Central Pacific Hurricane Center's area of responsibility, encompassing the area between 140 degrees west and the International Date Line, all names are used in a series of four rotating lists. The next four names that were slated for use in 1991 are shown below, however none of them were used.

Retirement

The World Meteorological Organization retired one name in the spring of 1992: Fefa. It was replaced in the 1997 season by Felicia.

Season effects
This is a table of all the storms that have formed in the 1991 Pacific hurricane season. It includes their duration, names, landfall(s), denoted in parentheses, damages, and death totals. Deaths in parentheses are additional and indirect (an example of an indirect death would be a traffic accident), but were still related to that storm. Damage and deaths include totals while the storm was extratropical, a wave, or a low, and all the damage figures are in 1991 USD.

|-
|  ||  || bgcolor=#| || bgcolor=#| || bgcolor=#| || No land areas affected || None || None ||
|-
|  ||  || bgcolor=#| || bgcolor=#| || bgcolor=#| || No land areas affected || None || None ||
|-
|  ||  || bgcolor=#| || bgcolor=#| || bgcolor=#| || No land areas affected || None || None ||
|-
|  ||  || bgcolor=#| || bgcolor=#| || bgcolor=#| || Guerrero, Colima || None || None ||
|-
|  ||  || bgcolor=#| || bgcolor=#| || bgcolor=#| || Oaxaca || Minimal || 1 ||
|-
|  ||  || bgcolor=#| || bgcolor=#| || bgcolor=#| || No land areas affected || None || None ||
|-
|  ||  || bgcolor=#| || bgcolor=#| || bgcolor=#| || Hawaii || None || None ||
|-
|  ||  || bgcolor=#| || bgcolor=#| || bgcolor=#| || No land areas affected || None || None ||
|-
|  ||  || bgcolor=#| || bgcolor=#| || bgcolor=#| || Guadalupe Island, California || Minimal || None ||
|-
|  ||  || bgcolor=#| || bgcolor=#| || bgcolor=#| || Sinaloa || None || None ||
|-
|  ||  || bgcolor=#| || bgcolor=#| || bgcolor=#| || Jalisco, Guerrero || Widespread || 10 ||
|-
|  ||  || bgcolor=#| || bgcolor=#| || bgcolor=#| || No land areas affected || None || None ||
|-
|  ||  || bgcolor=#| || bgcolor=#| || bgcolor=#| || Hawaii || None || None ||
|-
|  ||  || bgcolor=#| || bgcolor=#| || bgcolor=#| || No land areas affected || None || None ||
|-
|  ||  || bgcolor=#| || bgcolor=#| || bgcolor=#| || Guerrero, Colima || None || None ||
|-
|  ||  || bgcolor=#| || bgcolor=#| || bgcolor=#| || Sinaloa, Nayarit || None || None ||
|-

See also

List of Pacific hurricanes
Tropical cyclones in 1991
Pacific hurricane season
1991 Atlantic hurricane season
1991 Pacific typhoon season
1991 North Indian Ocean cyclone season
South-West Indian Ocean cyclone season: 1990–91, 1991–92
Australian region cyclone season: 1990–91, 1991–92
South Pacific cyclone season: 1990–91, 1991–92

References

External links

 NHC 1991 Pacific hurricane season archive
 Central Pacific Hurricane Center archive

 
Pacific hurricane seasons
Articles which contain graphical timelines